(also ) is a schloss in Wangels in Schleswig-Holstein, Germany. It is next to the Baltic Sea and about 100 km away from Hamburg.

The 75 hectare estate, including several restored historic buildings and a village, is owned by Jan Henric Buettner, who bought it for €7 million in 2005 and opened a luxury resort there in 2014. €7.5 million in the funding for the renovation and conversion was raised on the crowdfunding site Companisto, where it drew more investment than any other for-profit European organisation to that date. The resort's luxury restaurant Courier was awarded a Michelin star in the 2015 Guide and 16 Gault Millau points.

References

External links

Weissenhaus official website

Parks in Germany
Hotels in Germany
Manor houses in Germany
Heritage sites in Schleswig-Holstein